Prempeh College is a public secondary boarding school for boys located in Kumasi, the capital city of the Ashanti Region, Ghana. The school was founded in 1949 by the Asanteman traditional authority, the British Colonial Government, the Methodist Church Ghana and the Presbyterian Church of Ghana. The School is named after the King of Ashanti, (Asantehene) Sir Osei Tutu Agyeman Prempeh II, who donated the land on which the school was built. and was modeled on Eton College in England. The school topped matriculation at the Kwame Nkrumah University of Science and Technology in 2004 with 441 students admitted and in 2012, with 296 students from the college admitted, and is considered to be one of the best secondary schools in Ghana. The School has won the National Robotics Championships a record five times between 2013 and 2021. In 2016 Prempeh College won the Toyota Innovation Award at the International Robofest World Championships held in Michigan, USA.

History

In the early 1940s, the British Colonial Government invited the Presbyterian and Methodist Churches, which had already established institutions such as Wesley Girls High School and the Presbyterian Boys Secondary school in Krobo Odumase based on their experience, to help set up a school in the middle belt of Ghana to serve the northern sector of the country. Although there were some delays due to the second world war, in 1948 Prempeh College was designed by renowned British modernist Architect Maxwell Fry and his wife Jane Drew.

Compared to other works by Jane Drew in Ashanti region, Prempeh College campus was designed to incorporate modernist refinements as described by Lain Jackson and Jessica Holland in their book titled "The Architecture of Edwin Maxwell Fry and Jane Drew: Twentieth Century Pioneer Modernism and the tropics".  
 
According to the Ashanti Pioneer Newspaper, the opening ceremony of Prempeh College was held on the 5th February 1949. Major C. O.Butler, the chief commissioner of Ashanti gave the following address at the ceremony;

There is a great and growing need for training men to take up posts of responsibility not just as clerks in offices but in Agricultural Education, Mining, Forestry, Architecture, Engineering and Building in the many other technical posts on the fulling of which by Africans the future development of Ashanti and the Gold Coast as a whole largely depends … We British from overseas are here to help you ultimately to administer the country yourselves … until you yourselves can provide the agriculturalists, engineers, the technicians and the tradesmen who can develop the natural resources of your country.  
 
In summary the college was expected to produce scientists and technocrats who could play vital roles in the economy of the Gold Coast. At the same opening ceremony, Prempeh II outlined his expectation for Prempeh College: the hope that the students of the college would shine not only in the intellectual field but also in the moral firmament.

As of 2012, the headmaster was E. K. Yeboah, a member of CHASS.

Uniform
The school uniform includes a green shirt with the college crest. Students wear this to class on a daily basis. For ceremonial purposes students wear a green jacket with an embroidery of the college crest. The college blazer (suit) was in use from the beginning in 1949, was dropped in the 1980s, then revived in 2003. Students wear the college suit for ceremonial purposes, such as speech days and graduation ceremonies.

School magazine
The magazine of Prempeh College has long been called The Stool. It is a 100-page document which gives annual reports of the school. With a patron, an editorial board and the SRC, they deliver to the student body the all-formidable magazine. What has always been featured, for example, are perceptions about the school outside, short messages from students of the college to other schools, interviews with alumni and many interesting features.

Achievements

Prempeh College was the first school to win the National Science and Maths Quiz in 1994 and 1996. The College also won the 2015 ,2017 and 2021 editions of the Ghana National Science and Maths Quiz  that makes them one of the most successful schools in the National Science and Maths Quiz competitions. Prempeh College has also won the Ghana National Debate championship competition a record two times in 1997 and in 2004. Prempeh College is the first Secondary institution in Ghana and Africa to win the world Robofest 2016 or World Robotics competition, beating giants from China, Japan and other industrialised countries. They won the Toyota Innovation Award that year and are the only school from Africa to win it. Prempeh College Robotics Club has also won a number of other robotics awards over the years, some of their achievements include: 2016 Ashanti Regional Robotics Champions, Robofest Toyota Innovation Award Champions 2016, Robofest National Champions 2016, National Robotics 2015, National Robotics Champions 2014, Regional Robotics Champions 2013, winners of the Regional Robotics Competition 2012, Achievement in Best Programming at the Robotics Inspired Science Education Competition 2011, The 2016 National Robofest Qualifiers, Presec-Legon, Ghana Champions. The school represented Ghana at the World robotics olympiad in New Delhi India
The school also represented Ghana at the World Robotics Online Competition where the school amassed a total of 22 trophies. A total of 3 teams were presented by the school with the teams 1st, 3rd and 5th spots in the competition. The school became the first ever to win the competition for a second consecutive time having won the prior competition in Michigan. However the 2020 edition was held online due to the impact of the Covid-19 on travelling.

Notable alumni
 

 Mohammed Abdul-Saaka, deputy minister in the second republic
 Sam Adjei, physician
 Samuel Yaw Adusei, former deputy Ashanti Regional Minister 
 Jot Agyeman, author, actor, playwright and media executive 
 Kwesi Ahwoi,  former Minister for the Interior of Ghana.
 Francis Amanfoh, diplomat
 Abednego Feehi Okoe Amartey, Vice Chancellor of the University of Professional Studies
 Joseph Amoah, sprinter representing Ghana at the 2019 World Athletics Championships and national record holder in the men's 200 metres
 Richard Twum Aninakwah, Justice of the Supreme Court of Ghana (2004–2008)
 Edmund Owusu Ansah, footballer
 Yaw Appau, active Justice of the Supreme Court of Ghana (2015–2021)
Kwame Baah, Ghanaian soldier and politician; formerly Minister for Lands and Mineral Resources,  Minister for Foreign Affairs, and Minister for Economic Planning during the Acheampong regime.
 Hon Kwadwo Baah-Wiredu, Ghanaian Politician, Former Minister of Education
 Fritz Baffour, television producer and media consultant is the managing director of Tropical Visionstorm Limited
 Baffour Adjei Bawuah, diplomat
 Kofi Boahene, physician
 Nana Osei Bonsu II, the traditional ruler of Ashanti Mampong
 Yussif Chibsah, footballer
 Dr. Kwabena Duffuor, Former Governor Bank of Ghana, Finance Minister, Founder UniBank Ghana
Maxwell Kofi Jumah Former Mayor of Kumasi 
 Sadat Karim, footballer 
 John Kufuor, former president of the Republic of Ghana
 Osagyefo Kuntunkununku II- Okyenhene
 Joakim Lartey, percussionist
Kwadwo Mpiani, Former Chief of Staff and Minister for Presidential Affairs
 Martin Osei Nyarko, footballer
 Michael K. Obeng, Ghanaian American Plastic Surgeon
 Dominic Oduro, footballer
 Prof. Kwadwo Asenso Okyere, former Vice Chancellor, University of Ghana, Legon, former head of Food and Agriculture, UNO 
 Dr. Matthew Opoku Prempeh, MP for Manhyia South and Minister for Energy, Ghana
 Kwadwo Afoakwa Sarpong, former Ghanaian diplomat
 Kwabena Sarpong-Anane, acting Director General of the Ghana Broadcasting Corporation (2010–2011)
 Tonyi Senayah, Chief Executive Officer of Horseman Shoes
 Kwaku Sintim-Misa Ghanaian actor, director, satirist, talk show host, and author.

See also 
List of boarding schools
List of senior high schools in the Ashanti Region

References

External links

 School website
 AmanAdehyeeLegon
 wins-another-most-organi.html AmanAdehyƐ-Legon wins another "Most Organized Old Students Association" award
 Senior High Schools and Colleges

Boys' schools in Ghana
Educational institutions established in 1949
Education in Kumasi
1949 establishments in Gold Coast (British colony)
High schools in Ghana